Yu Geli (born March 29, 1976 in Laiyang, Yantai, Shandong) is a female Chinese handball player who competed in the 1996 Summer Olympics and in the 2004 Summer Olympics.

In 1996 she finished fifth with the Chinese team in the women's competition. She played all four matches as goalkeeper.

Eight years later she was a member of the Chinese team which finished eighth in the women's competition. She played all seven matches as goalkeeper.

External links
profile  
profile

1976 births
Living people
Handball players at the 1996 Summer Olympics
Handball players at the 2004 Summer Olympics
Olympic handball players of China
Chinese female handball players
Sportspeople from Yantai
Handball players from Shandong
Asian Games medalists in handball
Handball players at the 1998 Asian Games
Handball players at the 2002 Asian Games
Handball players at the 2006 Asian Games
Asian Games bronze medalists for China
Medalists at the 2002 Asian Games
21st-century Chinese women